Xinjiang Goldwind Science & Technology Co., Ltd., commonly known as Goldwind, is a Chinese multinational wind turbine manufacturer headquartered in Beijing, China. Goldwind was a state-owned enterprise before 2007, with largest shareholders including Hexie Health Insurance, China Three Gorges Renewables Group, and the National Social Security Fund, state-controlled corporations holding almost 40% shares. Its founder, Wu Gang, is a Communist Party member and had a seat in the 12th National People's Congress.

In 2016, it was ranked third for onshore and also third for offshore turbine manufacturing by Bloomberg New Energy Finance.

History 
Xinjiang Wind Energy, the predecessor of Xinjiang Goldwind, was founded by using a $3.2 million grant, given by the Danish government, which they used to build China's first wind farm at Dabancheng. Dabancheng wind farm, opened in 1989, consisted of the thirteen small, 150 kilowatts, wind turbines made by Danish turbine maker, Bonus Energy.

Goldwind was founded by Wu Gang as part of China government's 863 Program and was funded by the state. The funding helped Goldwind open its first assembly plant in Urumqi and sign technology transfer agreement with a German turbine manufacturer Vensys.

In 2008, Goldwind purchased its permanent magnet direct-drive (PMDD) technology from Vensys. Goldwind had 1,500 employees in 2009.

In 2010, Goldwind acquired a $6bn low-interest loan from the government-owned China Development Bank as part of its expansion plan.

In 2015, Goldwind became the largest turbine manufacturer in the world but in 2019 Vestas took over.

Operations 
With offices and facilities throughout Asia, Europe and the Americas, Goldwind employs over 6,000 staff and, combined, has an installed capacity base of 38 gigawatts (GW) across six continents. Goldwind is principally engaged in research, development, manufacturing and marketing of large-sized wind turbine generator sets. The company's major products include 1.5MW, 2.0MW, 2.5MW, and 3MW(S) Permanent Magnet Direct-Drive (PMDD) wind turbine generators. The company also provides wind power technology services, investment and sale of wind power projects and technology transfer service.

Goldwind Americas, a wholly owned subsidiary of Xinjiang Goldwind Science & Technology, Co., Ltd., is based in Chicago, Illinois, and currently employs approximately 100 individuals. Goldwind Americas (Goldwind USA, Inc.) has installed approximately 500 MW of PMDD turbines. In 2016 and 2017, Goldwind acquired two Texas projects totaling a combined capacity of 300 MW. Once constructed, the Rattlesnake Wind Project and Heart of Texas Wind Project  will be Goldwind's largest U.S. projects to date. In 2017, Goldwind obtained $140m in tax equity financing commitments from a unit of Berkshire Hathaway Energy and Citi for its 160MW Rattlesnake wind project in central Texas – easily the most financing of US origin yet secured by a Chinese turbine OEM in the U.S. market. Goldwind Americas also manages and operates the company's Panamanian team, which oversees the Penonome I and Penonome II wind farms totaling 270 MW, and the Chilean service operations team.

Goldwind Australia is the Australian subsidiary that owns and operates both wind and solar energy farms in Australia.

Products 

In 1998 Goldwind started the production of Jacobs 43/600 and Jacobs 48/600 turbines. 
This German wind turbine with conventional geared drive train is similar to HSW600 and was designed by aerodyn Energiesysteme GmbH.
Later the design has been geared to Jacobs 48/750 and Goldwind by the German engineering consultancy aerodyn.

Nowadays Goldwind turbines are exclusively PMDD machines.

Goldwind's initial use of the PMDD fully converted design came through its partner and eventual subsidiary Vensys Energy, with the VENSYS 62 which has been in operation since 2004.

PMDD models above 1000 kW
 1.5 MW 
 2.0 MW
 2.5 MW 
 3 MW (S) (onshore & offshore)
 6.0 MW (offshore only)
 10 MW (offshore only)

Previous generation models below 1000 kW
 600 kW series wind turbine
 750 kW series wind turbine

See also 

 List of wind turbine manufacturers
 Wind power in China

References

External links 

   
 Official website 

Engineering companies of China
Wind turbine manufacturers
Manufacturing companies of China
Companies based in Xinjiang
Manufacturing companies established in 1998
Chinese companies established in 1998
Companies listed on the Hong Kong Stock Exchange
Companies listed on the Shenzhen Stock Exchange
Chinese brands
H shares
Government-owned companies of China